The Bord na Móna O'Byrne Cup is a Gaelic football competition organised by the Leinster GAA and first staged in 1954.

The competition is named after Matt Byrne, a former Wicklow GAA club and county officer. By virtue of a quirk in translation, the Corn Uí Bhroin became known as the O'Byrne cup even though Matt had never used an 'O' in his surname. Byrne was born on February 14, 1870, was a native of Baltinglass and taught at the local national school on Chapel Hill. Deeply involved in GAA activities at any levels throughout his life, he was regarded as a good footballer in his youth as well as an excellent handballer. He was the first secretary of the Maurice Davins' club in Baltinglass and served as a member of the Wicklow County Board for over 50 years, mostly as county registrar. He was also his county's representative on Leinster and Central Councils and served as President of the Irish Handball Council from 1941-1944. He died on September 21, 1947. The competition participants are the eleven Leinster county teams (excluding Kilkenny). Formerly third-level teams competed, but from 2018 onward only county teams play. The competition is, together with the Walsh Cup and Kehoe Cup, part of the Bord na Móna Leinster GAA Series which takes place each January.

The current O'Byrne Cup champions are Dublin, who beat Laois in the 2022 final.

The O'Byrne Shield was introduced for teams knocked out of the first stage of the Cup but was later abandoned in 2013 due to the introduction of group stages in the competition.

Top winners

Previous finals

 *Wexford awarded title as Westmeath refused to play extra time

The O'Byrne Shield
The O'Byrne Shield was an inter county competition between the losers of the first round of the O'Byrne Cup. The competition began in 2006 with Longford winning in the final. The 2007 final was contested by Longford and Athlone IT and Longford won the game on a scoreline of 2–10 to 1–7, while the 2008 title was awarded to Laois after the competition was never completed. The O'Byrne Shield ended as a competition prior to the 2013 season and will no longer be played due to the group stages of the O'Byrne Cup which gives each team a minimum of 3 matches.

Top winners

References

 
Leinster GAA inter-county football competitions
Gaelic football cup competitions